This is a list of the second-level administrative divisions of the Kingdom of Morocco including all provinces and prefectures in descending order of their total areas as per the Census Report of 2004.

Note: Most areas of some divisions are shown combined.

 area
Administrative divisions